Christ Church Burial Ground in Philadelphia is an important early-American cemetery.  It is the final resting place of Benjamin Franklin and his wife, Deborah.  Four other signers of the Declaration of Independence are buried here, Benjamin Rush, Francis Hopkinson, Joseph Hewes and George Ross. Two more signers (James Wilson and Robert Morris) are buried at Christ Church just a few blocks away.

The cemetery belongs to Christ Church, the Episcopal church founded in 1695 and place of worship for many of the famous Revolutionary War participants, including George Washington. The burial ground is located at 5th and Arch Streets, across from the Visitors Center and National Constitution Center.  The Burial Ground was started in 1719, and it is still an active cemetery. The Burial Ground is open to the public for a small fee, weather permitting; about 100,000 tourists visit each year. When the Burial Ground is closed, one can still view Benjamin Franklin's gravesite from the sidewalk at the corner of 5th and Arch through a set of iron rails. The bronze rails in the brick wall were added for public viewing in 1858 by parties working at the behest of the Franklin Institute, which assumed the responsibility of defending Franklin's historic ties to Philadelphia after prominent Bostonians criticized the city's maintenance of the grave and erected a Franklin statue there. Leaving pennies on Franklin's grave is an old Philadelphia tradition.

Burials
Other famous people buried at Christ Church Burial Ground include:
John Andrews, D.D., (1746-1813), 4th Provost of the University of Pennsylvania
Michael Woolston Ash (1789–1858), congressman
Samuel John Atlee (1739–1786), delegate to the Continental Congress
Benjamin Franklin Bache (1769–1798), grandson of Benjamin Franklin, printer and publisher of the Aurora newspaper
Sarah Franklin Bache (1743–1808), daughter of Benjamin Franklin
Commodore William Bainbridge (1774–1833), Naval hero of War of 1812, captain of "Old Ironsides"
Francis Biddle (1886–1968), United States Attorney General
James Biddle (1783–1848), Commodore in the United States Navy
Thomas Bond (1713–1784), co-founder of Pennsylvania Hospital
Major General George Cadwalader (1806–1879), Civil War general
John Cadwalader (1805–1879), congressman and judge
Matthew Clarkson (1733–1800), mayor of Philadelphia
Joseph Clay (1769–1811), United States Congressman
Tench Coxe (1755–1824), Continental Congressman
William Henry Drayton (1742-1799), Continental Congressman and a Signer of the Articles of Confederation
John Dunlap (1747–1812), printer of the Declaration of Independence
Lewis Evans (c.1700–1756), cartographer and surveyor
Tench Francis, Jr. (1730-1800)
David Franks (1740–1793), aide-de-camp for General Benedict Arnold during the American War of Independence
Samuel Hardy (1758–1785), Continental Congressman (Note: probably buried at St Paul's Cemetery in NYC. See Bio)
Michael Hillegas (1729–1804), first Treasurer of the United States
Thomas Hopkinson (1709–1751), father of Francis Hopkinson, president of the Philosophical Society, one of the founders of the Library Company
John Inskeep (1757–1834), mayor of Philadelphia
Major William Jackson (1759–1828), Revolutionary War officer, secretary of the Constitutional Convention
Thomas Lawrence, five-time mayor of Philadelphia
Major General Charles Lee (1732-1782), a controversial Revolutionary War officer and second-highest ranking general after George Washington from 1776 to 1778.
Charles Mason (1728–1786), astronomer, surveyor, laid out the Mason–Dixon line in 1763
George A. McCall (1802–1868), United States Army brigadier general and prisoner of war during the American Civil War
William M. Meredith (1799–1873), United States Secretary of the Treasury
Philip Syng Physick (1768–1837), known as the "Father of Modern Surgery"
John Hare Powel (1786-1856), Pennsylvania State Senator and Agriculturalist
Samuel Powel and his wife Elizabeth Willing Powel 
Henry C. Pratt (1761–1838) prominent Philadelphia businessman and builder of Lemon Hill House.
Matthew Pratt (1734–1805) American "Colonial Era" portrait painter.
Col. Isaac Read (1739-1777) Virginia revolutionary and commander of the 1st Virginia Regiment, died of disease during the war.
Benjamin Rush (1746–1813), signer of the Declaration of Independence and founder of Dickinson College, known as "The Father of American Psychiatry"
Annis Boudinot Stockton (1736–1801), poet
Philip Syng (1703–1789), silversmith, created the Syng inkstand, early co-founder of several organizations with Benjamin Franklin
Henry Tazewell (1753–1799), U.S. Senator
Commodore Thomas Truxtun, commander of the USS Constellation
William Tuckey (1708–1781), composer
John Goddard Watmough (1793-1861), U.S. Congressman
Charles Willing, (1710–1754), three term Mayor of Philadelphia
Anne Willing Francis (1733-1812) wife of Tench Francis, Daughter of Charles Willing

References

External links

 
 Official Map of Christ Church Burial Ground (archived 28 September 2007)
 Christ Church Burial Ground at Find a Grave

Anglican cemeteries in the United States
Cemeteries on the National Register of Historic Places in Philadelphia
1719 establishments in Pennsylvania
History of Philadelphia
Old City, Philadelphia
Tourist attractions in Philadelphia
Religious buildings and structures completed in 1719